Jan Chlístovský (born 15 May 1934) is a former Czech cyclist. He competed in the team pursuit at the 1960 Summer Olympics.

References

External links
 

1934 births
Living people
Czech male cyclists
Olympic cyclists of Czechoslovakia
Cyclists at the 1960 Summer Olympics
Sportspeople from Prague